(Johan) August Söderman (17 July 1832 in Stockholm – 10 February 1876 in Stockholm) has traditionally been seen as the pre-eminent Swedish composer of the Romantic generation, known especially for his lieder and choral works, based on folk material, and for his theatre music, such as the incidental music to Ludvig Josephson's Marsk Stigs döttrar ("Marshal Stig's Daughter"), 1866, or his Svenskt festspel ("Swedish Festival Music").

The son of a musical father and a pupil of the Royal Swedish Academy in Stockholm, he studied piano, but mastered the oboe and violin as well.  In 1856–57 he studied counterpoint at the Leipzig Conservatory with Ernst Richter; there, in a musical culture that bore the imprint of Mendelssohn, he became familiar with the music of Robert Schumann and also with that of Richard Wagner. On his return to Stockholm he worked as a theatre conductor, and at the Royal Swedish Opera as choirmaster and eventually assistant conductor.

He wrote several operettas (The Devil’s First Try, 1856) and incidental music for about 80 plays, such as a Swedish translation of Schiller's Die Jungfrau von Orleans ("The Maid of Orleans"). His influence can be detected in the music of later Swedish Romantic composers, Hugo Alfvén and Wilhelm Peterson-Berger.

Söderman died aged 43. His music is virtually unknown outside Sweden.

List of Works (selected)

Orchestral music 

 Concert overture in F major, 1855? -68
 Chariveripolka, 1848
 Intermezzo (Sailors' Lives), 1850s
 Burlesque, 1855
 Scherzo (sketch), 1856
 Swedish festival, 1858, originally overture to A few hours at Kronoborg Castle and the Virgin of Orleans
 Swedish folk songs and folk dances, possibly identical to Nordic folk songs and folk dances, printed posthumously in 1897
 Festmarsch, 1869
 Bellman melodies, printed 1870
 Sorgmarsch in C minor, 1871
 Charles XV's mourning march in E minor, 1872
 Festpolonäs in A major, 1873
 Festmarsch in E flat major, 1873

Works for choir and orchestra (selected) 
Söderman composed a large amount of vocal works for different choruses or solo voice. Selected works are listed below. For a full list, see the Swedish-language article. 

 An die Freude (Friedrich von Schiller), for male choir and orchestra, 1859
 Tempelsalen (Temple Hall) (E Wallmark, for male choir and orchestra), 1863
 Die Wallfahrt nach Kevlaar (The Pilgrimage to Kevlaar) (Heinrich Heine) for baritone, choir and orchestra, 1859-66
 Signefills färd (Signefill's journey) (Ludvig Josephson) for soloists, choir, and orchestra, 1869
 Das Heidelberger Fess (Friedrich von Hagedorn) for bass, male choir and piano, 1869
 Hjertesorg (Heartbreak) (Karl Wetterhoff) for soprano, mixed choir and orchestra, 1870, orchestrated by Ludvig Norman
 Spiritual songs for mixed choir and organ, printed 1872
 Kyrie
 Agnus Dei
 Jesus Christ
 Domine
 Benedict
 Virgo Gloriosa
 Osanna
 Catholic Mass for soloists, mixed choir, and orchestra, 1875

Chamber music 

 Piano Quartet in E minor, 1856

Music for piano 

 Fantasier à la Almqvist, 1868
 Cherkassy dance, 1871

External links
 
 

1832 births
1876 deaths
19th-century classical composers
19th-century male musicians
Male opera composers
Musicians from Stockholm
Romantic composers
Swedish classical composers
Swedish male classical composers
Swedish opera composers